The Asian Baseball Cup is a baseball tournament organized by WBSC Asia. It is a second-level tournament to the Asian Baseball Championship. In 2012, the Asian Baseball Cup was divided into two separate divisions, East and West, alternatively called the East Asian Baseball Cup and West Asian Baseball Cup. From 2016, the Asian Baseball Cup tournaments are held biannually.

The tournament serves as a qualifier for two teams that will later compete in the Asian Baseball Championship, along with Chinese Taipei, Japan, South Korea and China, which automatically qualify for the latter tournament and therefore do not compete at the Asian Baseball Cup.

Results

Before 2012

After 2012

Eastern Division
See footnote

Western Division
See footnote

Medal table

References

External links
Asian Baseball Cup results (Baseball Federation of Asia)

 
Cup